This is a list of football games played by the Thailand national under-21 football team

2016

2017

2018

External links
 Football Association of Thailand 
 Thai Football.com
 Thai football page of Fifa.com
 Thai football Blog

U-21